The 1939 Southern Illinois Maroons football team was an American football team that represented Southern Illinois Normal University (now known as Southern Illinois University Carbondale) in the Illinois Intercollegiate Athletic Conference (IIAC) during the 1939 college football season.  Under first-year head coach Glenn Martin, the team compiled a 0–8 record and finished in last place in the IIAC. The team played its home games at McAndrew Stadium in Carbondale, Illinois. 

George Holliday, a fullback from Elkville, and Elbert Smith, a tackle from Carterville, were the team captains. Quarterback Bob Musgrave was the team's only representative on the Associated Press All-Illinois Intercollegiate Conference football team. Other key players included Heine Stumpf and Bill Groves.

Schedule

References

Southern Illinois
Southern Illinois Salukis football seasons
College football winless seasons
Southern Illinois Maroons football